Arilus, or wheel bugs, is a genus of true bugs in the family Reduviidae, subfamily Harpactorinae and tribe Harpactorini. Most species are found in the Americas.

Species 
Five extant species plus one fossil species are included within this genus:<ref name=biolib>{{cite web|title=Arilus Hahn, 1831: Genus information BioLib|url=https://www.biolib.cz/en/taxon/id426329/|website=biolib.cz|accessdate=11 May 2020}}</ref>
 Arilus carinatus (Forster, 1771)
 Arilus cristatus (Linnaeus, 1763)
 Arilus depressicollis (Stål, 1859)
 †Arilus faujasi Riou, 1999
 Arilus gallus (Stål, 1872)
 Arilus nigriceps Herrich-Schaeffer, 1848

Three additional species originally described in the genus are currently incertae sedis. Arilus auctus Germar, 1837
 Arilus collaris Herrich-Schaeffer, 1848
 Arilus spiniceps'' Blanchard, 1843

References

External links
 
 

Reduviidae
Heteroptera genera